Barwell may refer to:

Barwell, village in Leicestershire
Barwell F.C., the local football team
Barwell, London, a small locality in south-west London
Barwell (surname)
Barwell (1782 ship)